Hawley Lane Mall is one of two shopping malls in Trumbull, Connecticut, United States, located near Exit 8 of Route 8 North or South, also Exit 51 of Route 15 North, the Merritt Parkway and Exit 52 of Route 15 South, the Merritt Parkway. Current anchor stores include Best Buy, HomeGoods, Kohl's, and Target.

History
Hawley Lane Mall opened in 1971 with two anchor stores, Caldor (featuring a two-story design and belt escalators) and a Waldbaum's supermarket. Other, smaller stores such as B. Dalton booksellers and Hawley Lane Shoes have also called the mall home. A third anchor store, Sage-Allen took up residence on the mall's new upper level in 1982. 
During the late 1980s and early 1990s, the mall became less profitable due to expansions at both the Milford Crossroads & Trumbull Shopping Park malls.
Sage-Allen went out of business in 1993, merging with to become Filene's, which in turn closed the Hawley Lane store so as not to compete with its larger locations in both Milford and Trumbull. Steinbach then took over the space between 1997 and 1999 before they went bankrupt. Caldor also went bankrupt in 1999, while at the same time all Waldbaum's stores closed and left the state. This left the mall with no anchor stores.

Sale and new era
Shortly after purchasing the mall, National Realty and Development Corp. spent $8 million on a refit of the entire property in 2005. The firm also managed to add Kohl's and then HomeGoods as new anchor stores, which were quickly followed by Target and Best Buy.

Transportation
Bus transportation is available via the Greater Bridgeport Transit Authority, along with taxi service.

See also

Westfield Trumbull, another mall in the same town.

References

Buildings and structures in Trumbull, Connecticut
Shopping malls in Connecticut
Shopping malls established in 1971
Shopping malls in the New York metropolitan area
1971 establishments in Connecticut